Tenebroides laticollis is a species of bark-gnawing beetle in the family Trogossitidae.

References

Further reading

External links

 

Trogossitidae
Beetles described in 1862